Ecliptoides azadi is a species of beetle in the family Cerambycidae. It was described by Tavakilian and Peñaherrera-Leiva in 2003. It is endemic to Guyana where it flies in September.

References

Rhinotragini
Beetles described in 2003
Endemic fauna of Guyana